Sinan (Amharic: ስናን) is one of the woredas in the Amhara Region of Ethiopia. Part of the Misraq Gojjam Zone, Sinan is bordered on the southwest by Guzamn, on the west by Machakel, on the north by Bibugn, on the northwest by Debay Telatgen, on the east by Awabel, and on the south by Aneded. Towns in Guzamn include Rob Gebeya. Sinan was part of Guzamn woreda.

The highest point in this woreda as well as in the Misraq Gojjam Zone is Mount Choqa (also known as Mount Birhan), a part of the Choqa Mountains, with an elevation of 4154 meters above sea level.

Demographics
Based on the 2007 national census conducted by the Central Statistical Agency of Ethiopia (CSA), this woreda has a total population of 98,939, of whom 49,423 are men and 49,516 women; 4,562 or 4.61% are urban inhabitants. The majority of the inhabitants practiced Ethiopian Orthodox Christianity, with 95.97% reporting that as their religion.

Notes

Districts of Amhara Region